J. Edward Hutchinson (October 13, 1914 – July 22, 1985) was an American lawyer and politician from the state of Michigan. A member of the Republican Party, he represented Michigan's 4th congressional district in the United States House of Representatives from 1963 to 1977.

Early life 
Hutchinson was born in Fennville, Michigan and graduated from Fennville High School in 1932. He graduated from the University of Michigan in Ann Arbor in 1936, and was a member of Acacia Fraternity. He graduated from the University of Michigan Law School in 1938, and was admitted to the State Bar of Michigan that same year. Hutchinson thereupon established a law practice in Allegan, Michigan.

Hutchinson enlisted as a private in the United States Army in January 1941, served as a noncommissioned officer in the Fourteenth Coast Artillery, as a captain in the Transportation Corps, and was discharged in April 1946.

Political career 
Hutchinson was elected to the Michigan House of Representatives in 1946 and 1948, and was a member of the Michigan Senate, 1951-1960. He was a delegate to the 1948 Republican National Convention and chairman of the Republican State convention in April 1952.  He was delegate and vice president of the constitutional convention, in 1961 and 1962 that resulted in the Michigan Constitution of 1963.

Hutchinson was elected as a Republican from Michigan's 4th congressional district to the 88th United States Congress and to the six succeeding Congresses, serving from January 3, 1963 to January 3, 1977). He was not a candidate for reelection in 1976.  He was the ranking Republican on the Judiciary Committee during the impeachment process against Richard Nixon. Although he was long considered loyal to Nixon, in August 1974 Hutchinson called for Nixon's resignation or impeachment because of the Watergate scandal.

Later life 
Hutchinson returned to Fennville after retiring from Congress. He died in Naples, Florida on July 22, 1985, at the age of 70 years. He is buried at the Fennville Cemetery.

References

The Political Graveyard: Hutchinson, Edward
Obituary New York Times July 24, 1985 (accessed February 10, 2007)
Acacia Fraternity official website: notable alumni

|-

1914 births
1985 deaths
Burials in Michigan
Republican Party members of the Michigan House of Representatives
Republican Party Michigan state senators
University of Michigan Law School alumni
United States Army officers
Republican Party members of the United States House of Representatives from Michigan
20th-century American politicians
People from Allegan County, Michigan
Military personnel from Michigan